The Scotland Beds is a geologic formation in Barbados. It preserves fossils of Falconoplax bicarinella and Palaeopinnixa perornata, dating back to the Early Eocene period.

See also 
 Geography of Barbados
 List of fossiliferous stratigraphic units in Barbados

References

Further reading 
 Caves and Karst of Barbados, Patricia N. Kambesis & Hans G. Machel
 J. S. H. Collins and S. F. Morris. 1976. Tertiary and Pleistocene crabs from Barbados and Trinidad. Palaeontology 19(1):107-131
 J. W. Wells. 1934. Some fossil corals from the West Indies. Proceedings of the United States National Museum 83(2975):71-110

Geologic formations of the Caribbean
Geology of Barbados
Paleogene Caribbean
Conglomerate formations
Shallow marine deposits
Tidal deposits